Crosswater Club is a private golf club in the northwest United States, located in central Oregon at Sunriver, southwest of Bend. 

At its opening in 1995, it was the longest course in the United States.

The course hosted the JELD-WEN Tradition tournament for four years, from 2007 to 2010, a senior major championship. It has also hosted the PGA Professional National Championship four times: 2001, 2007, 2013, and 2017.

References

External links
 
 PGA Professional National Championship
 Golf Link on Crosswater Club

Golf clubs and courses in Oregon
Buildings and structures in Deschutes County, Oregon
Golf clubs and courses designed by Robert E. Cupp
1995 establishments in Oregon